The men's heavyweight is a competition featured at the 2013 World Taekwondo Championships, and was held at the Exhibition Center of Puebla in Puebla, Mexico on July 19. Heavyweights were limited to a minimum of 87 kilograms in body mass.

Medalists

Results
DQ — Won by disqualification
K — Won by knockout
P — Won by punitive declaration
W — Won by withdrawal

Finals

Top half

Section 1

Section 2

Bottom half

Section 3

Section 4

References
Entry List
Draw
Results
Results Book Pages 547–590

Men's 88